Millionaires Express (also known as The Millionaires' Express or Shanghai Express; released in the Philippines as China Warriors) is a 1986 Hong Kong martial arts western comedy film written and directed by Sammo Hung. The film stars Hung, Yuen Biao, Rosamund Kwan, Mei-sheng Fan and Hwang Jang-lee.

Plot
In Russia, Ching Fong-tin attempts to steal goods from Russian soldiers. They catch him and force him to strip down to his underwear and dance for their amusement. He escapes by stealing the soldiers' grenades and blowing up the cabin with them inside. Ching is immediately caught by government agent Fook Loi, but escapes and retrieves his clothes.

In Ching's home town, policeman Jook Bo and his allies set fire to a large building, as a diversion for a bank robbery. Tsao Cheuk-kin and his fire team race to the scene and save a fat lady and a blind woman. While the fire rages, the criminals rob the bank; two of them are caught and jailed. Mayor Yi gives a negative speech lamenting that there is no chance of recovering the stolen money; in contrast, Tsao encourages the townsfolk, and he is given the job of head of the town's security.

A train is due to pass the town, carrying numerous wealthy passengers including Wong Kei-ying and his young son Wong Fei-hung, as well as three Japanese who are in possession of a stolen map showing the location of the Terracotta Army. A group of bandits conspire to steal the map; separately, Jook Bo's criminal group plan to board the train. Ching's ambition is to bring money into the town, so he intends to force the train to stop at the town by blowing up the tracks with dynamite. Ching recruits a group of women, including Chi and Siu-hon, and they clean up and redress a hotel. When questioned by Tsao, the women claim to be make-up artists.

Ching places dynamite at the railway station, but is caught by Tsao; they fight, knocking Tsao out. As the train travels through the country, passenger Han uses the roof to sneak back and forth between his wife and his mistress. Jook Bo's criminals try to board the train, using magnets, a lasso, and a cart. When the train reaches the station, Ching blows the dynamite, derailing the train.

As Ching had planned, the passengers spend time in his home town awaiting the train's repair. In the hotel, the criminals seeking the map attempt to occupy the room housing Han's mistress, in order to spy on the three Japanese in the room next door. The criminals don't know the language, and are forced to hide when the train captain and his mistress enter the room. Han enters the room via the hotel roof, inadvertently scaring the train captain's mistress. The commotion alerts his wife, who accuses him of cheating. To explain the situation, Han claims that he is actually an agent spying on the Japanese, which prompts the criminals to emerge from hiding and share the same excuse.

Fook Loi returns from Russia and uses Tsao to capture Ching and put him into jail. At night, Siu-hon and her group of ladies free Ching. An army of bandits arrives on horseback, storming the town and capturing the Japanese and other passengers.

Ching returns to town and frees Fook, Tsao, Siu-hon and her women, and Jook Bo and his criminals from jail. Ching and Fook attack the bandits with a multiple-barrel firearm, while their allies free the Japanese and the other train passengers. A huge fight breaks out, until the bandits are dealt with and Ching and Tsao finally take back the map from the Japanese.

Cast

 Sammo Hung as Ching Fong-tin
 Yuen Biao as Fire Chief Tsao Cheuk-kin
 Rosamund Kwan as Chi
 Kenny Bee as Fook Loi / Lai Fu
 Peter Chan as Firefighter / Security Officer
 Olivia Cheng as Siu-hon
 Chin Kar-lok as Firefighter / Security Officer
 Chin Siu Ho as Siu Cheung
 Emily Chu as Prostitute Employee Bo
 Chung Fat as Mountain Bandit
 Fan Mei Sheng as Mountain Bandit (as Mei-sheng Fan)
 Hsiao Ho as Siu Hau
 Hwang Jang-lee as Yukio Fushiki
 Yasuaki Kurata as Ninja
 Phillip Ko as Mountain Bandit
 Lam Ching-ying as Security Officer / Bank Robber
 Billy Lau as Train Captain
 Lau Kar-wing as Kang
 Mang Hoi as Security Officer / Convict / Bank Robber (as Randy Mang)
 Richard Ng as Han
 Lydia Shum as Han's Wife 
 Richard Norton as Mountain Bandit
 Yukari Ôshima as Female Ninja
 Cynthia Rothrock as Mountain Bandit
 Shih Kien as Master Sek
 James Tien as Yun Shiyu / Shi Yu
 Eric Tsang as Jook Bo 
 Jimmy Wang Yu as Master Wong Kei-ying
 Dick Wei as Mountain Bandit
 Woo Fung as Mayor Yi
 Wu Ma as Security Officer / Convict / Bank Robber
 Bolo Yeung as Cotton Weaver
 Yuen Wah as Security Officer / Convict
 Johnny Wang as Train Robber
 Cho Tat-wah as Shanghai Chief Inspector
 Teresa Ha as Cotton Weaver's Wife

Release
Millionaires Express was released in Hong Kong on 30 January 1986. In the Philippines, the film was released as China Warriors by Asia Films on 2 August 1987, rated "G" by the Movie and Television Review and Classification Board.

Home media
The film was initially released on DVD in Hong Kong by Universe Laser (Region 0). It was re-released in 2006 by Joy Sales (Region 3).

In the US it was released in 1999 by Tai Seng, under the title The Millionaires Express (with a leading "The"). It was re-released in 2007 by Dragon Dynasty under the title Shanghai Express.

In the UK it was released in 2005 by Hong Kong Legends / Contender Entertainment Group, under its original title.

In July 2021, Eureka Entertainment released the film on Blu-ray in the United Kingdom, under the title The Millionaires' Express, as a two-disc set containing the 97 minute Hong Kong theatrical cut, the 101 minute extended version (a.k.a. the "international" cut), the 92 minute English export cut, and a new 109 minute "hybrid" cut. In September 2022, Eureka released a single-disc edition containing only the former two cuts of the film.

Notes

References

External links

 The Millionaires Express at filmaffinity.com

1980s Western (genre) comedy films
1986 action films
1986 comedy films
1986 films
1986 martial arts films
1980s Cantonese-language films
Films about bank robbery
Films set on trains
Films directed by Sammo Hung
Golden Harvest films
Hong Kong martial arts comedy films
Hong Kong martial arts films
Ninja films
1980s Hong Kong films